Mitchell v MNR, [2001] 1 S.C.R. 911 is a leading Supreme Court of Canada decision on aboriginal rights under section 35(1) of the Constitution Act, 1982. The court held that Mitchell's claim to an aboriginal right to import goods across the Canada–US border was invalid as he was unable to present enough evidence showing that the importation was an integral part of the band's distinctive culture.

In 1988, Grand Chief Michael Mitchell, a Mohawk of Akwesasne, attempted to bring goods from the US into Canada. At the border he declared everything that he had purchased in the US but refused to pay any duty on it, claiming that he had an aboriginal right to bring goods across the border.

At trial, the Federal Court agreed with Mitchell and held that there was an aboriginal right to import goods. The decision was upheld by the Federal Court of Appeal.

The Supreme Court overturned the decision, and held that Mitchell was required to pay duty for all of the goods he imported.

See also
 List of Supreme Court of Canada cases (McLachlin Court)
The Canadian Crown and First Nations, Inuit and Métis
 Canadian Aboriginal case law
Numbered Treaties
Indian Act
Section Thirty-five of the Constitution Act, 1982
Indian Health Transfer Policy (Canada)

External links
 

Canadian Aboriginal case law
Supreme Court of Canada cases
2001 in Canadian case law
Taxation case law
Canada–United States relations